Federico Barbosa Gutiérrez (27 April 1952 – 26 August 2018) was a Mexican politician affiliated with the Institutional Revolutionary Party. As of 2014 he served as Deputy of the LIX Legislature of the Mexican Congress representing Tlaxcala.

He previously served in the Congress of Tlaxcala as well as Attorney General of Tlaxcala.

References

1952 births
2018 deaths
Politicians from Tlaxcala
Institutional Revolutionary Party politicians
Meritorious Autonomous University of Puebla alumni
Academic staff of the Autonomous University of Tlaxcala
Members of the Congress of Tlaxcala
Mexican prosecutors
20th-century Mexican lawyers
20th-century Mexican politicians
21st-century Mexican politicians
Members of the Chamber of Deputies (Mexico) for Tlaxcala